Kanu Behl (born 1980) is an Indian film director and screenwriter. He is known for his work in Hindi cinema.

He assisted director Dibaker Banerjee on the cult hit Oye Lucky! Lucky Oye! and co-wrote LSD: Love Sex aur Dhokha.

His directorial debut, Titli, appeared at several international film festivals, including Melbourne, Rio de Janeiro, Zurich, Filmfest Hamburg, and BFI London. The script of Titli was selected by NFDC for the Screenwriters' Lab 2012, later winning the Post Production Award at Film Bazaar's Work-In-Progress Lab.

Titli was nominated for Caméra d'Or at 2014 Cannes Film Festival.

Early life and education
Kanu Behl spent his early years in Patiala, Punjab before moving to Delhi in 1990. Both his parents, Navnindra and Lalit Behl are writer-actor-directors and also directed telefilms for the state-run Doordarshan channel.

He studied at Apeejay School, Noida and sought a bachelor's degree in Business from Shaheed Sukhdev College of Business Studies, Delhi University. In 2003, he joined the Satyajit Ray Film and Television Institute and pursued a PG Diploma in Cinema. While at the Institute, he attended the Berlinale Talent Campus 2007 and made his documentary 'An Actor Prepares', about a struggling actor, who after seven years decides to give himself 15 days to make it in the film industry or return home. The documentary entered competitively at Cinéma du Réel 2007, a documentary film festival in France.

In January 2019 Behl married music composer Sneha Khanwalkar.

Career
After graduating from SRFTI, he produced and directed documentaries for the international channels NHK, Japan and ZDF/Arte. He worked with Dibakar Banerjee on the feature film Oye Lucky! Lucky Oye! as an Assistant director. In 2010, he co-wrote the critically acclaimed Love Sex aur Dhokha with Banerjee and was chief assistant director on the project.

In 2012, the script of his first independent feature film Titli, was selected by NFDC for the Screenwriters' Lab 2012, which later won the 'Post-Production Award' at Film Bazaar's Work-In-Progress Lab in 2013. Titli, appeared at several international film festivals, including the 2014 Cannes Film Festival, Melbourne International Film Festival, Rio de Janeiro International, Zurich Film Festival, Filmfest Hamburg, BFI London Film Festival and the Chicago International Film Festival.  Written and directed by Behl and co-produced by Dibakar Banerjee Productions and Yash Raj Films, Titli was selected to take part in the Un Certain Regard section of the 2014 Cannes Film Festival.

Filmography

Awards and nominations
 Nominated for 56th Filmfare Awards in Best Screenplay Category for film Love, Sex Aur Dhoka.
 Nominated for Apsara Awards in Best Screenplay Category for film Love, Sex Aur Dhoka.
 Nominated for Caméra d'Or at 2014 Cannes Film Festival 
 Critics Prize at FIFIB, Bordeaux
 Best Film at Seattle South Asian Film Festival 
 NETPAC Award at Hawaii International Film Festival
 Best Film at SAIFF, New York 
 Best International Film at Malatya International, Turkey 
 Best Actress and Best Film, Gijón International Film Festival, Spain
Best Foreign First Film (Critics Award) at French Syndicate of Cinema Critics 2016

References

External links

Film directors from Punjab, India
Living people
1980 births
Satyajit Ray Film and Television Institute alumni
Indian male screenwriters
Delhi University alumni
People from Delhi
Hindi-language film directors
Apeejay School alumni